Bhoanj is a village in the Punjab province of Pakistan. It is located at the distance of around 15 km from the city of Jhelum. Bhoanj is located at the banks of Upper Jhelum Canal.
Bhoanj is located in a valley between Tilla Jogian mountain range and the hills of Pubbi. 
The village has a government schools for both boys and girls and there is also a couple of clinics providing medical facilities.

Demographics
The population of village Bhoanj is around 8000 persons with 55% male and 45% female ratio.

Economy
Bhoanj is a rapidly growing village and the expansion is fed by growing number of its residents finding work and doing businesses in other major cities of Pakistan and quite a few of them are living and working in other countries mainly UAE, Kuwait, Qatar, Saudi Arabia, France, United Kingdom and Spain to name a few.

Transport
Bhoanj is very well connected the outside world with a good road connection to the city of Jhelum which is at half an hour drive away. The capital Islamabad can be reached in just over 2 hours through the Grand Trunk Road (GT Road). The nearest airport is Sialkot airport but most of the population prefer Islamabad or Lahore airports for domestic and international travels.

Villages in Jhelum District